Morupule Thermal Power Station is a coal-fired power station in Botswana. It is responsible for an estimated 80 percent of the country's domestic power generation.

Location
The geographical coordinates of Morupule Thermal Power Station are 22°31'12.0"S, 27°02'12.0"E (Latitude:-22.520000; Latitude:27.036667).

Overview

Morupule A
Morupule A Power Station comprises four air-cooled 33 megawatts coal-fired units, with coal supplied from the adjacent Morupule Colliery, owned by Debswana. Total generation capacity is 132 megawatts. Construction on the existing station started in 1982 and was completed in 1989.

In 2016, the government of Botswana sourced funds to renovate and restore Morupule A. The contract was won by Doosan Heavy Industries & Construction at a contract price of BWP:2.5 billion (US$204 million in 2016 money). The upgrade was expected to last until 2018. On completion of the upgrade Morupule A is expected to function at 80 percent plant availability for another 15 years (until 2033).

Morupule B
Botswana Power Corporation (BPC) was considering an expansion of the Morupule Power Station since 2006. BPC eventually decided on 600 megawatts, consisting of four 150 megawatts units. At the time this project was conceptualized, 80 percent of the electricity consumed in Botswana, was imported from the South African utility, Eskom. The World Bank and the African Development Bank both provided partial funding to the construction of Morupule B. In 2010 construction began, with the lead contractor being China National Electric Equipment Corporation (CNEEC). Completion was expected in 2012.

However, by April 2013, Units I and II were out of service, undergoing repairs for cracks in their air ducts, that developed soon after installation. Unit III, the only functioning unit at the time, had also developed the same problem. Unit IV was still under construction. This led to severe power shortage, resulting in load shedding and rolling blackouts.

In January 2014, the government of Botswana hired STEAG Energy Services of Germany to  “identify problems created by CNEEC and rectify them”. After CNEEC was forced to leave, on 31 December 2013, STEAG took over maintenance and operation of Morupule B, effective 1 January 2014. Installation of all four units was completed in 2014. In June 2018, the government of Botswana terminated talks with state-owned China Machinery Engineering Corporation (CMEC), in attempts to divest from Morupule B. These negotiations had been ongoing since 2016. In 2018, the power station was producing at about 81 percent capacity (producing approximately 486 megawatts).

Controversy
The Morupule B Power Station has been beset with problems right from the start. A forensic investigation into the matter has found that Botswana Power Company staff members colluded with CNEEC to embezzle more than BWP:1 billion (approx. US$90.5 million in 2014), from the BWP:10 billion (approx. US$905 million) Morupule B power project.

Ownership
Morupule A and Morupule B are both owned 100 percent by the Botswana Power Corporation (BPC).

See also
 List of power stations in Botswana

References

External links
 About Botswana Power Corporation

Coal-fired power stations in Botswana
1989 establishments in Botswana
Energy infrastructure completed in 1989